Wenna ( 463   18 October ???) is a Cornish saint and the dedicatee of several churches, venerated in the Eastern Orthodox Church, Roman Catholic Church, and Anglican Communion. Her feast day is 18 October.

Wenna founded churches in Talgarth, Wales, and St Wenn, Cornwall, and chapels at St Kew, Cornwall and Cheristow, near Stoke-by-Hartland, Devon.

Biography

Wenna is thought to have been a daughter of Brychan a legendary king of Brycheiniog in South Wales. Her first church was at Talgarth, near her home.

She, Nectan (her brother), and possibly other siblings evangelized Cornwall where she founded the church at St Wenn (near Bodmin) and chapels at St Kew and Cheristow near Hartland.

She was murdered by pagans on 18 October of an unknown year at Talgarth.

She should not be confused with her niece Wenna (Gwen ferch Cynyr), a 6th-century queen.

References

6th-century Christian saints
Children of Brychan
Medieval Cornish saints
Female saints of medieval England
Christian royal saints
6th-century English people
6th-century English women